Noah Elias is an American artist, known simply as Noah, working within the fine art market and custom art scene. He is best known for painting the Suki art car in 2 Fast 2 Furious, but is also a widely collected painter of Disney Fine Art.

Due to his success as an artist, he founded Noah University to teach other creatives and artists how to make a career from their work.

Biography 

Noah was born March 28, 1971 in Orange County, California, and found he had a gift early on: I started my company when I was still in high school.  I was doing lettering, signs and promotional banners for businesses and restaurants... My business card was even in the high school yearbook.

Noah soon took his art to the streets, painting portraits of celebrities on canvas for huge crowds outside neighborhood coffee shops.  His portraits soon attracted collectors like Nicole Kidman, Tom Cruise, Val Kilmer, Craig T. Nelson and The Black Crowes.  This celebrity exposure made Noah an overnight star within the art community.  Soon after, corporate clients like Lexus Motor Cars, Levi's Jeans and Toyota, were asking Noah to enhance their corporate collections and ad campaigns.

Noah had long since realized that "canvas was the ticket... It allowed [him] to spend a much time on a piece and generate income."  Before long, though, Noah began painting on different surfaces:  "I have come up with different avenues in my work, and I meet a lot of markets that way."
And in 2004 he garnered international fame for his paint job, or "rolling canvas," on the Suki car in Universal Pictures' hit movie, 2 Fast 2 Furious.  He has since won "Best Paint" at S.E.M.A. (Specialty Equipment Marketing Association) 4 years in a row for the "rolling canvases" he created on behalf of Alpine Electronics.  Noah is also known for the body art he has applied for many ad campaigns; most recently he did body art on the recording artist Pink, decorating her body with tattoos for a music video.

Noah now devotes a substantial amount of his time towards creating Disney Fine Art, a mixture of his unique style and those beloved Disney characters.  He feels very "blessed with the unique opportunity to create art that helps carry on the legacy and heritage of Walt Disney's dream."

Style 

Each canvas begins with a rough sketch.  Once a subject and composition are chosen, Noah uses models and also his own photographs as references.  Once he has sketched his composition onto canvas (or any of the many different types of surfaces he paints on), Noah proceeds to carefully airbrush the composition and over paints with many different effects from his vast arsenal of painting techniques.
I like to mix photorealism with drips and rags. It contradicts itself but it works at the very end – the organic and natural contrasts beautifully with the structure of the airbrush and photorealism. It’s a nice marriage of techniques that gives the work more depth. The effect is almost Trompe-l'œil; especially with the water drops on the flowers.

Quotes 
On painting Disney Fine Art:
Disney was and is still a blessing.  They allowed me to do my own style of art with their characters.  It's a blast. I enjoy continuing the magic of Walt's dream and being part of something so special.  It really brings me back to being a kid.  Great memories.
On his eclectic style:
An important way to stretch myself is to make each painting different than the last and to not fall into a comfort zone.  A lot of artists paint one subject, one medium and one style.  I like so many different materials and looks that I like to change it up.  Also, I believe it allows me the chance to reach different industries and types of collectors.
On what inspires him:
My relationship with Christ is hands-down the most important thing in my life and the reason for being...My inspiration comes through daily experiences and my pursuit of Christ's character.  There are days that are extremely challenging with certain projects or paintings, but it's on these days that I get to learn more about myself and what God wants to accomplish through me.

References

External links 
Artist Official Disney Fine Art Site
Artist's Official Site
Noah University 

1971 births
20th-century American painters
American male painters
21st-century American painters
Living people
20th-century American male artists